Geoffrey Thomas Virgo (9 November 1918 – 5 January 2001) was an Australian politician.

Political career
From 2 March 1968 to 29 May 1970 he represented the electoral district of Edwardstown in the South Australian House of Assembly as a member of the Labor Party.  The district of Edwardstown was abolished in May 1970 after a Boundary Redistribution. From 30 May 1970 to 14 September 1979 he represented the electoral district of Ascot Park in the South Australian House of Assembly as a member of the Australian Labor Party.

Virgo was the Minister of Roads and Transport from 2 June 1970 until 19 April 1973. Virgo was also the Minister of Local Government from 2 June 1970 through 15 March 1979. On 19 April 1973 the Ministry of Roads and Transport was abolished and Virgo became the Minister of Transport through 18 September 1979. From 15 March 1979 until 18 September 1979 Virgo was also the Minister of Marine.

He did not stand for re-election at the 1979 election. His Labor Party colleague, John Trainer, succeed in replacing him as the elected member for Ascot Park – although the Liberal Party managed to form a majority government.

References 

1918 births
2001 deaths
Members of the South Australian House of Assembly
Australian Labor Party members of the Parliament of South Australia
20th-century Australian politicians
Members of the Order of Australia